Nordhavn station is a commuter rail and rapid transit railway station in Copenhagen, Denmark.

The station serves the eastern part of the district of Østerbro, as well as the harbour area of Nordhavn. The station is by the lines A, H, B, C, and E of the Copenhagen S-train network and line M4 of the Copenhagen Metro network. The S-train station opened in 1934, and the metro station opened in 2020.

History 
Nordhavn station was opened on 15 May 1934 simultaneously with the opening of the S-train service on the Boulevard Line between Østerport station and Copenhagen Central Station also known as Røret (literally: the tube).

In 2006 the station was rebuilt. The existing shop and DSB ticket office were merged into a new 7-Eleven shop that is located just inside the station entrance.

The metro station opened on 28 March 2020 with the opening of the M4-line of the Copenhagen Metro.

Gallery

See also
 List of railway stations in Denmark
 Rail transport in Denmark

References

External links

S-train (Copenhagen) stations
Railway stations opened in 1934
1934 establishments in Denmark
Nordhavn, Copenhagen
Knud Tanggaard Seest railway stations
M4 (Copenhagen Metro) stations
Railway stations in Denmark opened in the 20th century